Sude Nur Sözüdoğru (born 10 June 2002) is a Turkish women's football goalkeeper, who plays in the Turkish Women's First Football League for Horozkent Spor.

Club career
Sude, who started football at Horozkent Spor in Denizli, transferred to the newly established Galatasaray club in the 2021–22 Super League season.

On 13 August 2022, the player was rented by Galatasaray to Horozkent Spor, the club where she started football, for 1 year.

International career
As part of the Turkey girls' U-17 team, she played at the UEFA Women's Under-17 Championship qualification  matches of 2018 and 2019 as well as 2018 UEFA Women's U-16 Development Tournament.

She was a member of the Turkey women's U-19 team. She appeared in the  2020 UEFA Women's U-19 Championship qualification - Group 12 matches.

By July 2020, she was called up to the Turkey women's national team.

Career statistics

References

External links
 

2002 births
Living people
Sportspeople from Denizli
Women's association football goalkeepers
Turkish women's footballers
Turkey women's international footballers
Galatasaray S.K. women's football players
Turkish Women's Football Super League players
21st-century Turkish sportswomen